The McCornick Building, at 10 W. 100 South in Salt Lake City, Utah, was built in 1890–93.  It is also known as the Crandall Building. It was listed on the National Register of Historic Places in 1977.

Description
The seven-story commercial building is one of few surviving from those built during Salt Lake City's building boom before the Panic of 1893.

It was built for William S. McCornick (1837-?), "a classic western entrepreneur whose business success mirrors the history of western economic development" who derived from a farm near Picton, Ontario, Canada, and who arrived in Salt Lake City in 1873.

It was deemed "an outstanding example of the transitional period of commercial architecture which anticipated Louis Sullivan's 'skyscraper'
movement, originally situated among small one- and two-story stores which it dominated, the McCornick Block is significant as a precursor in the development of early modern architecture in Salt Lake City, as evident in the purely Sullivanesque McIntyre Building (National Register nominee) which adjoined the McCornick Block on the north in 1909."

It was designed by Louis Mendelssohn of architects Mendelssohn, Fisher and Lawrie, of Omaha, Nebraska.

It was owned and managed by Robert E. Crandall for 50 years.

See also

 National Register of Historic Places listings in Salt Lake City
 Knutsford Hotel (1891), also in Salt Lake City and designed by Mendelssohn, Fisher and Lawrie

Notes

References

External link

 Walter S. McCornick, banker, Salt Lake City, a cartoon portrait

National Register of Historic Places in Salt Lake City
Early Commercial architecture in the United States
Buildings and structures completed in 1890